The teams competing in Group 5 of the 2015 UEFA European Under-21 Championships qualifying competition were Switzerland, Ukraine, Croatia, Latvia and Liechtenstein.

The ten group winners and the four best second-placed teams advanced to the play-offs.

Standings

Results and fixtures
All times are CEST (UTC+02:00) during summer and CET (UTC+01:00) during winter.

Goalscorers
7 goals
  Marcelo Brozović

5 goals
  Darko Jevtić

4 goals
  Haris Tabaković

3 goals

  Ante Rebić
  Pajtim Kasami
  Simon Kühne
  Pylyp Budkivskyi
  Andriy Totovytskyi

2 goals

  Mario Šitum
  Vladislavs Gutkovskis
  Deniss Rakels
  Igors Denis Rei
  Valerijs Šabala
  Mërgim Brahimi
  Michael Frey
  Oleksandr Noyok
  Vladyslav Kalytvyntsev
  Vladyslav Kulach
  Dmytro Ryzhuk

1 goal

  Dražen Bagarić
  Tin Jedvaj
  Petar Mišić
  Stipe Perica
  Bruno Petković
  Mislav Oršić
  Dario Župarić
  Artūrs Karašausks
  Dmitrijs Klimaševičs
  Roberts Savaļnieks
  Nassim Ben Khalifa
  Leonardo Bertone
  Remo Freuler
  Francisco Rodríguez
  Shani Tarashaj
  Max Veloso
  Silvan Widmer
  Ruslan Babenko
  Vitaliy Buyalskyi
  Ruslan Malinovskyi
  Redvan Memeshev
  Dmytro Yusov

1 own goal

  Simon Zahn (against Ukraine)
  Samuel Zimmermann (against Croatia)

References

External links
Standings and fixtures at UEFA.com

Group 5